ABCR can refer to :

 Akron Barberton Cluster Railway
 The ABCA4/ABCR gene implicated in some age-related macular degeneration